Thomas Ogden is a psychoanalyst and writer, of both psychoanalytic and fiction books, who lives and works in San Francisco, California.

Ogden received a BA from Amherst College, MA, and an MD from Yale, where he also completed a psychiatric residency.  He served for a year as an Associate Psychiatrist at the Tavistock Clinic in London, and did his psychoanalytic training at the San Francisco Psychoanalytic Institute, where he has remained on the faculty.  For more than 25 years he has served as Director of the Center for the Advanced Study of the Psychoses.  He has also been a member of the North American Editorial Board for the International Journal of Psychoanalysis, and Psychoanalytic Dialogues.

Ogden is a supervising and personal analyst at the Psychoanalytic Institute of Northern California.

Psychoanalytic approach
Ogden has been referred to as "a poet's psychoanalyst — someone who listens to his patients on the level of voice, metaphor."

Gregorio Kohon, of the British Psychoanalytical Society, remarks that "Ogden belongs to that rare group of psychoanalysts who are also good writers.  ...he re-creates the vitality of his own dream-life through creative readings of poetry and the unspoken, of fiction and mourning, of analytic sensibility and the aliveness of language.  Ogden transforms the relationship between reader and writer into a fruitful and intimate dialogue.  One's own reveries, ruminations, daydreams, memories, and - of course - dreams, become part of the conversation with him."

In his own words, Ogden has described how his "position in the analytic world has not been that of an advocate of a school of psychoanalysis (or as an adversary of 'opposing' schools of psychoanalysis.)  Neither do I view myself as a 'lone voice', because that suggests that I think of myself as a renegade.  I would much prefer to describe myself as an independent thinker."

Thomas Ogden's style and personal contributions to psychoanalysis include: 
 his introduction of the concept of “the analytic third”
 his use of reverie  
 a revised conception of aspects of analytic technique - including the fundamental rule, the use of the couch, and dream analysis
 the concept of an “autistic-contiguous position” in mental experience
 revised understandings of the male and female Oedipus complex
 his unique perspective on the use of language in psychoanalysis
 his approach to the psychoanalysis of schizophrenic patients
 the relationship between psychoanalysis and literature
 creative readings of seminal works by major 20th Century psychoanalytic writers

Awards
Ogden's honors include  the 2004 International Journal of Psychoanalysis Award for the Most Important Paper of the year; the 2010 Haskell Norman Prize, an international award for Outstanding Achievement in Psychoanalysis; the 2012 Sigourney Award.; and the 2014 Hans Loewald Award for Distinguished Contribution to Psychoanalytic Education.

Bibliography
 2021 - Coming to life in the consulting room: towards a new analytic sensibility
 2021 - This will do...: a novel
 2016 - Reclaiming Unlived Life: Experiences in Psychoanalysis
 2016 - The Hands of Gravity and Chance: A Novel
 2014 - The Parts Left Out: A Novel
 2013 - The Analyst's Ear and the Critic's Eye: Rethinking Psychoanalysis and Literature (co-authored with Benjamin Ogden)
 2012 - Creative Readings: Essays on Seminal Analytic Works
 2009 - Rediscovering Psychoanalysis: Thinking and Dreaming, Learning and Forgetting
 2005 - This Art of Psychoanalysis: Dreaming Undreamt Dreams and Interrupted Cries
 2001 - Conversations at the Frontier of Dreaming
 1997 - Reverie and Interpretation: Sensing Something Human
 1994 - Subjects of Analysis
 1989 - The Primitive Edge of Experience
 1986 - The Matrix of the Mind:  Object Relations and the Psychoanalytic Dialogue
 1982 - Projective Identification and Psychotherapeutic Technique

References

1946 births
Living people
Amherst College alumni
Yale School of Medicine alumni